This article lists those who were potential candidates for the Republican nomination for Vice President of the United States in the 2008 election. On March 4, 2008, Senator John McCain of Arizona won the 2008 Republican nomination for President of the United States, and became the presumptive nominee.

McCain held an event with Alaska governor Sarah Palin, revealing her as his vice-presidential running mate on August 29, 2008 (the date coinciding both with McCain's 72nd birthday and the Palins' 20th wedding anniversary), at the Ervin J. Nutter Center in Dayton, Ohio, the day after Barack Obama's acceptance speech. The McCain–Palin ticket ultimately lost in the general election to the Obama–Biden ticket. John McCain later in life came to regret the pick.

Selection process
Sarah Palin was the GOP choice for Vice President. At a speech in Norfolk, Virginia, McCain told supporters that regional considerations would have less bearing on his decision than the candidate's perceived ability to take over the office of the presidency–and the candidate's "values, principles, philosophy, and priorities." One factor that McCain had to consider, more so than did his opponent, was age. Had McCain won in 2008, he would have (on January 20, 2009) been the oldest person to assume the Presidency in U.S. history at initial ascension to office, being 72 years old. Other factors to be considered were shoring up the conservative base, choosing someone with executive experience, expertise in domestic policy (to complement McCain's foreign policy focus), and electoral college calculations.

McCain initially wished to choose Lieberman, his close friend and the 2000 Democratic vice presidential nominee, as his running mate; however, Lieberman's liberal record (voting with Democrats 86.9% of the time in the 110th Congress) and pro-choice stance led McCain's aides to veto the choice. Close aide Mark Salter preferred Pawlenty, while the campaign manager Steve Schmidt preferred Palin. By picking Palin, Schmidt argued, McCain could snatch the "change" mantle away from Obama. McCain, rejecting 'safer' choices such as Pawlenty or Romney, instead chose Palin as his running mate.

Shortlist

Media speculation on John McCain's possible running-mates
After his selection by Republican primary voters as presumptive presidential nominee, news sources and political pundits began to speculate on whom McCain would or should choose, based on the candidates' ability to enhance the Republican ticket, personality (ability to work well with McCain), and preparedness for assuming the office of the presidency. The Associated Press reported that McCain had composed a list of 20 or so potential running mates. Over two dozen names had been offered as viable potential running mates by the Kansas City Star, the Salt Lake Tribune, the New York Sun, the Indianapolis Star, the Saint Louis Post Dispatch, the Times of India, and The Globe and Mail. This list includes both names that had been mentioned in several sources and some much less likely candidates:

Members of Congress

Governors

Federal executive branch officials

Other individuals

Declined interest

See also 
John McCain 2008 presidential campaign
2008 Republican Party presidential candidates
2008 Republican Party presidential primaries
2008 Republican National Convention
2008 United States presidential election
List of United States major party presidential tickets

Notes

References

John McCain 2008 presidential campaign
John McCain
Sarah Palin
Vice presidency of the United States
Mike Huckabee
Rick Perry
Paul Ryan
Michael Bloomberg
Mitt Romney
2008 in women's history